Scedella caffra is a species of tephritid or fruit flies in the genus Scedella of the family Tephritidae.

Distribution
Burundi, Uganda, Mozambique, Zimbabwe, South Africa.

References

Tephritinae
Insects described in 1861
Diptera of Africa